White River Glacier may refer to:

 White River Glacier (Oregon)
 White River Glacier (Washington)